Crux or the Southern Cross is a constellation.

Crux may refer to:

Literature and publications
 "Crux", a poem by Patti Smith from her 1996 book The Coral Sea
 Crux, a 2013 novel in The Nexus Trilogy by Ramez Naam
 Crux (comics), an American comic book published by CrossGen Entertainment
 Crux (journal), a journal published by the Australian Student Christian Movement from 1961 to 1972
 Crux (literary), a passage whose correct reading is difficult to determine
 Crux (online newspaper), a news website focusing on Catholic news

Music
 The Crux (band), an American band
 The Crux (album)

Science and technology
 Crux cordis or crux of the heart, an area of the heart
 CRUX, a Linux distribution
 "Crux", a theme in the GNOME desktop environment

TV and videogames
 Crux, a character in the anime TV series Final Fantasy: Unlimited
 Crux, Gryphus-1's air operator in the videogame Ace Combat X: Skies of Deception
 The Crux, an armed fleet in the role-playing game Genshin Impact

Other uses
 Cross (Latin: crux) 
 Crux (climbing), the most difficult section of a climbing or mountaineering route
 Crux Mathematicorum, published by the Canadian Mathematical Society
 Yamaha Crux, a motorcycle manufactured by India Yamaha Motor

See also
 Cross (disambiguation)